Just Pretend may refer to:

 "Just Pretend" (Elvis Presley song), 1970
 "Just Pretend" (The Bens song), a song by the Bens from their 2003 EP The Bens
 "Let's Just Pretend" (Jo Stafford song), a 1944 song by Jo Stafford. In 1998 it was included on her compilation album Walkin' My Baby Back Home.
 "Let's Just Pretend", a song by Tyler Shaw from his 2015 album Yesterday